Game On is a touring exhibition on the history and culture of computer games. The exhibition was first shown at the Barbican Centre in London in 2002, and has since been exhibited by Barbican International Enterprises to over 20 countries, where it has been seen by over 2 million people.

The exhibition displays notable game developments from the early sixties to the present day, from the PDP-1 in 1960 to contemporary industry releases.

It reveals the design processes behind four of the most significant games of recent times: Tomb Raider, Grand Theft Auto, Pokémon and The Sims, following these games from their initial concept to the final product design.

Over 150 playable games are available, including Donkey Kong, Pong and Rock Band, and the top ten most influential games consoles.

 aims to highlight the wider, global framework of gaming, exploring the influence of manga and anime on computer games, as well as the films that have been influenced by, and continue to influence computer games. The exhibition also considers online gaming, music compositions for games, and the latest game technologies.

Showings
Barbican Art Gallery, London  (May 2002 to September 2002)
The Royal Museum at the National Museum of Scotland, Edinburgh (October 2002 to February 2003)
Tilburg Art Foundation, Netherlands (May 2003 to August 2003)
Helsinki City Art Museum, Finland (September 2003 to December 2003)
A European Capital of Culture event in Lille, France (May 2004 to August 2004)
Eretz Israel Museum in Israel (September 2004 to January 2005)
The Tech Museum of Innovation, San Jose (September 2005 to January 2006)
Museum of Science and Industry, Chicago (March 2005 to September 2005), ( February 2006 to April 2006) 
Pacific Science Center, Seattle (May 2006 to August 2006)
Science Museum, London (October 2006 to February 2007)
Cyberport, Hong Kong (July 2007 to October 2007) 
Australian Centre for the Moving Image, Melbourne (March 2008 to July 2008)
State Library of Queensland, Brisbane (November 2008 to February 2009)
National Science and Technology Museum, Kaohsiung, Taiwan (18 July to 31 October 2009)
The Cellars of Cureghem, Brussels (December 2009 to April 2010)
Ambassador Theatre, Dublin ( 20 September 2010 to 30 January 2011)
Galerías Monterrey, Monterrey, Mexico (30 April to 30 June 2011)
Museu da Imagem e do Som (MIS), São Paulo, Brazil (10 November 2011 to 8 January 2012)
CCBB, Brasília (26 January to 26 February 2012)
Museum of Popular Art, Lisbon, Portugal (16 March to 30 June 2012) 
Costanera Center, Santiago Chile (27 March 2013 to 15 May 2013)
Tecnopolis, Buenos Aires, Argentina (12 July 2013 to 3 November 2013)
Montreal Science Centre, Montreal, Quebec, Canada (15 April 2015 to 13 September 2015)
National Museum of Emerging Science and Innovation, Tokyo, Japan (2 March 2016 to 30 May 2016)

2.0
In 2010, the original show  was re-curated by Barbican International Enterprises to expand the original exhibition and the exhibition  2.0 was produced.  2.0 has been exhibited at:

Queen Victoria Museum and Art Gallery, Launceston, Tasmania (3 July to 3 October 2010) 
Technopolis, Athens, Greece (16 December 2010 to 16 March 2011)
Oregon Museum of Science and Industry, Portland, Oregon (2 July to 18 September 2011)
Kinokino centre for Art and Film, Sandnes, Norway (25 February to 9 June 2012)
VAM Design Center, Budapest, Hungary (19 October 2012 to 8 January 2013)
Ontario Science Centre, Toronto, Ontario, Canada  (9 March to 2 September 2013)
Swedish National Museum of Science and Technology, Stockholm, Sweden (25 October 2013 to 28 September 2014)
Life Science Centre, Newcastle upon Tyne, UK (23 May 2015 to 3 January 2016)
Norsk Teknisk Museum, Oslo, Norway (March 2016 to 29 January 2017)
Spazio Eventi Tirso, Rome, Italy (4 March 2017 to 6 June 2017)
Pavilhão da Bienal – Parque Ibirapuera, São Paulo, Brazil (16 August 2017 to 12 November 2017)
Village Mall, Rio de Janeiro, Brazil (1 December 2017 to 25 February 2018)
OCT Harbour, Shenzhen, China (18 August 2018 to 14 October 2018)
Fundacion Canal, Madrid, Spain (29 November 2019 to 31 May 2020)
Forum Groningen, Groningen, The Netherlands (2 October 2021 to )

Games that have been exhibited

1942
Adventure
Alien Attack/Scramble
Amanda the Witch's Apprentice (Dreamcast homebrew)
Amidar
Animal Crossing
Asteroids
Bag Man
Berzerk
Blue Dragon
Bob the Builder
Breakout
Bubble Bobble
BurgerTime
Burnout Paradise
Bust-A-Move 4
Cars
Castlevania: Lords of Shadow
Caveman
Centipede
Child of Eden
Chillingham
Code Breaker (cheating device)
Combat (Atari 2600 Pack-in Game)
Cookie Monster Munch
Dance Dance Fusion
Dark Reign
Daytona USA
Densha De Go – Train simulator
Destroy All Humans!
Dig Dug
Discs of Tron
Donkey Kong
Donkey Kong Country 3: Dixie Kong's Double Trouble!
Donkey Kong Jr.
Doom
Dragon Ball Z: Budokai Tenkaichi 2
Driver
Elite
Fighting Street
Final Fantasy VII
Forza Motorsport 2
Freeway
Frogger
Galaga
Galaxian
Garou: Mark of the Wolves
Gate of Thunder
Go by Train 3
GoldenEye 007
Gradius V
Guitar Hero
Gunstar Super Heroes
Half-Life 2
Halo: Combat Evolved
Halo 2
Halo 3
Heroes of the Pacific
Hey You, Pikachu!
Highway Star
The Hitchhiker's Guide to the Galaxy
Indy 500
Jak and Daxter
Junkbot
Katamari Damacy
Lady Bug
Le Mans 24 Hours
The Legend of Zelda: Ocarina of Time
Lego Star Wars: The Video Game
Lemmings
LocoRoco
Magical Drop 3
Mario & Sonic at the Olympic Games
Mario Bros.
Mario's Tennis
Mario Superstar Baseball
Max Payne
Metal Slug X
Metroid Prime
Missile Command
Moon Cresta
Moon Patrol
MotorStorm
Mr. Do!
Ms. Pac-Man
MSX Collection
New Super Mario Bros.
Nintendogs
Odin Sphere
OutRun 2006: Coast 2 Coast
Overtop
Pac-Man
Parappa the Rapper 2
Pengo
Phoenix
Pilotwings
Pirates of the Burning Sea
Pitfall!
Pokémon Emerald
Pokémon Stadium 2
Pokémon XD: Gale of Darkness
Pong
Pony Friends
Populous
Portal 2
Powerslide
Prince of Persia
Prince of Persia: The Sands of Time
Pro Evolution Soccer 2008
Puyo Puyo Tsu
Puzzle Quest: Challenge of the Warlords
Qix
Rave Racer
Rayman 2: The Great Escape
Resogun
Rez
Ridge Racer
RiME
Rockstar Games Presents Table Tennis
R-Type
Rugby 08
Sailor Moon Super S: Kondowa Puzzle de Oshiokiyo
Samurai Shodown II
Saturn Bomberman
The Secret of Monkey Island
Sega Superstars Tennis
Shark Attack
SimCity
Simon 2
Sokoban
Sonic Mega Collection
Sonic Rivals
Sonic The Hedgehog
Sonic X
Space Invaders
Space Invaders Part II
Space Panic
Space War
Speak and Spell
Star Soldier
Star Wars
Steel Battalion
Street Fighter II Turbo
Street Gangs
Super Mario 64
Super Mario All-Stars + Super Mario World
Super Mario Kart
Super Mario Galaxy 2
Super Monkey Ball 2
Super Smash Bros. Melee
[[Super mario Kart wii]]
Tennis
Tetris
The Hobbit
The Sims
Tomb Raider
Tony Hawk's American Wasteland
Track & Field
Transformers
TY the Tasmanian Tiger
Uridium
Vib-Ribbon
Viewpoint
Virtua Fighter
Virtua Fighter 2
Virtua Tennis 2
V/SpaceLab Bricklane Walkthrough
Warlords
Warning Forever
The Way of the Exploding Fist
Wii Sports
Wii Sports Resort
Windjammers
Xevious
Yaroze games

See also
The Art of Video Games – a similar exhibition at the Smithsonian American Art Museum that explores the artistic aspects of video games
Game Masters (exhibition) – a similar exhibition at the Australian Centre for the Moving Image that explores key designers of the video game medium
List of video games in the Museum of Modern Art – a list of video games in a similar, but smaller exhibition of the Museum of Modern Art

References

Further reading
 King, L. ed., : The History and Culture of Videogames (London, Adam AAID AIED King 1980).

External links 
 

Traveling exhibits
Video game exhibitions